Events from the year 1788 in Russia

Incumbents
 Monarch – Catherine II

Events

 Russo-Swedish War (1788–1790) begins
 Battle of Hogland
 Russo-Turkish War (1787–1792) continues
 Siege of Khotin (1788)
 Siege of Ochakov (1788)
 Naval actions at the siege of Ochakov (1788)
 Battle of Fidonisi

 Fruntimmersskolan i Viborg founded
 Kremlin Senate building completed
 Orenburg Muslim Spiritual Assembly established
 Ulyoty town founded

Births

 Alexander Albrecht (general), cavalry commander
 Yekaterina Avdeyeva, writer
 Auguste-Joseph Desarnod, French engraver and battle painter who spent most of his life in Russia
 Duke Eugen of Württemberg (1788–1857), German aristocratic exile and Russian general
 Maria Ikonina, ballerina. (d. 1866)
 Pavel Kiselyov, general, statesman, and reformer
 Sergey Stepanovich Lanskoy, Minister of the Interior 1855-1861, reformer
 Mikhail Lazarev, explorer and admiral
 Nikita Pankratiev, general
 Catherine Pavlovna of Russia, fourth daughter of Paul I of Russia
 Louis-Victor-Léon de Rochechouart, French aristocratic exile and Russian general
 Mikhail Vielgorsky, Russian official, composer, and arts patron
 Sergey Volkonsky, general and Decembrist
 Karl Friedrich von Rennenkampff, Baltic German general
 Semyon Yanovsky, Russian naval officer, the third governor of Russian America

Deaths
 Samuel Greig, Scottish sailor who became a Russian admiral
 Maria Rumyantseva, courtier (born 1699)
 Pyotr Sheremetev, wealthy nobleman and courtier
 Mikhail Volkonsky, general and statesman

References

1788 in Russia
Years of the 18th century in the Russian Empire